Coal Clough Wind Farm is one of the oldest onshore wind farms in England. The wind farm, which was built for Scottish Power, produced electricity from originally 24 Vestas WD34 wind turbines. It had a total nameplate capacity of 9.6 MW of electricity, enough to serve the average needs of 5,500 homes. It is situated near Burnley, Lancashire in the parish of Cliviger, near Coal Clough Farm, on the edge of Stiperden Moor in the South Pennines. For a few weeks it was the largest wind farm in the UK, until the much larger Penrhyddlan and Llidiartywaun wind farms (now called Llandinam) in Powys, Wales overtook it. It narrowly remained the largest in England until Coldham opened in Cambridgeshire in November 2005. The record was then taken yet again by Scout Moor Wind Farm  to the south west until May 2009 where Whitelee Wind Farm took and now holds it with 215 units with a total output capacity of 539 Mw. In 2009 Scottish Power announced plans to replace the existing turbines with eight 2 MW units with an estimated maximum height .

After many ups and downs during the years, the announced planning on re-powering the wind farm was soon granted and work quickly began onsite mid 2014 to early 2015. It involved the decommissioning & removal of the existing 24 turbines, the laying of new cabling and drainage, removal of current WD34 bases and placement of new foundations, upgrading/building service roads, substation installation, the erection of the newer & more efficient turbines you see in full operation today etc.

The new and improved Coal Clough Wind Farm is set to be in operation for its full 25 years "Usefulness" life span, and will then be decommissioned and removed from site to be either refurbished and sold on to businesses worldwide or sent to be recycled.

Notes

Power stations in North West England
Wind farms in England
Burnley